This article is a list of tables of code-driven unit testing frameworks for various programming languages.  Some, but not all, of these are based on xUnit.

Columns (classification)

 Name: This column contains the name of the framework and will usually link to it.
 xUnit: This column indicates whether a framework should be considered of xUnit type.
 TAP: This column indicates whether a framework can emit TAP output for TAP-compliant testing harnesses.
 SubUnit: This column indicates whether a framework can emit SubUnit output.
 Generators: Indicates whether a framework supports data generators. Data generators generate input data for a test and the test is run for each input data that the generator produces.
 Fixtures: Indicates whether a framework supports test-local fixtures. Test-local fixtures ensure a specified environment for a single test.
 Group fixtures: Indicates whether a framework supports group fixtures. Group fixtures ensure a specified environment for a whole group of Tests
 MPI: Indicates whether a framework supports message passing via MPI - commonly used for high-performance scientific computing.
 Other columns: These columns indicate whether a specific language / tool feature is available / used by a framework.
 Remarks: Any remarks.

Languages

ABAP

ActionScript / Adobe Flex

Ada

AppleScript

ASCET

ASP

Bash

BPEL

C

C#
See .NET programming languages below.

C++

Cg

CFML (ColdFusion)

Clojure

Cobol

Common Lisp

Crystal

Curl

DataFlex

Delphi

Emacs Lisp

Erlang

Fortran

F#

Go

Groovy
All entries under Java may also be used in Groovy.

Haskell

Haxe

HLSL

Igor Pro

ITT IDL

Internet

Java

JavaScript

Lasso

LaTeX

LabVIEW

LISP

Logtalk

Lua

MATLAB

.NET programming languages

Objective-C

OCaml

Object Pascal (Free Pascal)

PegaRULES Process Commander

Perl

PHP

PowerBuilder

PowerShell

Progress 4GL

Prolog

Puppet

Python

R programming language

Racket

REALbasic

Rebol

RPG

Ruby

SAS

Scala

Scilab

Scheme

Shell

Simulink

Smalltalk

SQL and Database Procedural Languages

SQL

MySQL

PL/SQL

IBM DB2 SQL-PL

PostgreSQL

Transact-SQL

Swift

SystemVerilog

TargetLink

Tcl

TinyOS/nesC

TypeScript

VHDL

Visual FoxPro

Visual Basic (VB6.0)
For unit testing frameworks for VB.NET, see the .NET programming languages section.

Visual Lisp

Xojo

XML

XSLT

Other

See also 

 List of GUI testing tools

Unit testing in general:
 Unit testing
 Software testing
 Mock object

Extreme programming approach to unit testing:
 xUnit
 Test-driven development (TDD)
 Behavior-driven development (BDD)
 Extreme programming

References